Daviesia quoquoversus is a species of flowering plant in the family Fabaceae and is endemic to the Blackdown Tableland in the Central Highlands of Queensland. It is a diffuse, spreading shrub with hairy, arching branchlets, crowded egg-shaped or heart-shaped, sharply-pointed phyllodes and yellow and red flowers.

Description

Taxonomy
Daviesia quoquoversus was first formally described in 1990 by Michael Crisp in Australian Systematic Botany from specimens collected on the Blackdown Tableland in 1971. The specific epithet (quoquoversus) means "in every direction".

Distribution and habitat
This daviesia grows with shrubs and grasses in open forest and is restricted to the Blackdown Tableland.

Conservation status 
Daviesia quoquoversus is listed as "vulnerable" under the Queensland Government Nature Conservation Act 1992.

References 

quoquoversus
Taxa named by Michael Crisp
Plants described in 1990
Flora of Queensland